Soho was an English musical trio, consisting of identical sisters Jacqueline (Jacqui) Cuff and Pauline Cuff, with producer Tim London (also known as Timothy Brinkhurst).  Other members of the group over the years have been Liam Gillick (now a well-known artist – Gillick also contributed on turntables and drums at Soho's early gigs), Eds Chesters (now of The Bluetones), Leigh Gorman (ex Bow Wow Wow) and Barry Smith (of Add N To X).  Also for a while, Bob and Henry Morris, who previously played with the trio when they were known as Groovalax.

Career
The sisters were born as Jacqui Cuff and Pauline Cuff born 1962 in Wolverhampton, England. Timothy Brinkhurst born 1960. In the early 1980s, when the Cuff sisters were student nurses, they performed together in St Albans, Hertfordshire, before meeting Brinkhurst, when the trio appeared as Tim London's Orgasm then Tim London and the Soho Sisters.

The group is known for their hit song "Hippychick" (composed by Brinkhurst and also credited by Johnny Marr), which was a Top 20 US Billboard Hot 100 chart hit in December 1990, and a Top 10 hit single in the UK Singles Chart in 1991. The song featured a sample from The Smiths' "How Soon Is Now?", sequenced over a Soul II Soul-type rhythm.  London told Mojo magazine that it "was written as a blues before The Smiths' samples and the rhythm were added".  "Hippychick" also went to number two for two weeks on the US Hot Dance Club Play chart, in a territory where the record was licensed to Warner's 
ATCO label from David Mimran's Tam Tam/Savage Records in the UK.

Prior to the release of "Hippychick", Soho recorded three albums for Virgin subsidiary Hedd Records, although only one, Noise, was released.  Subsequently, Soho released two albums on Savage/ATCO: Goddess and, in the US only, Thug.

In 1991, Soho recorded a single with Adamski, "Born To Be Alive", which peaked at No. 51 in the UK chart.
In 1994, Soho signed to Magnet/Warners on the strength of two self-financed albums, recorded after Savage Records folded.  The LPs, including a 'self-titled' album called Oosh (an anagram of Soho) and another one called Yard, remained unreleased until 2008, when the latter album was released on download.

During the 1990s they performed a cover version of the Icicle Works hit "Birds Fly (Whisper to a Scream)" for the soundtrack of the film Scream. The track "Nuthin' on my Mind" featured in the 1991 John Hughes film, Career Opportunities. "Hippy Chick" featured on the 1990 compilation album, Happy Daze.

The band attained some brief press notoriety in 1992 with their track "Claire's Kitchen" (on Thug), which referenced the alleged affair between Prime Minister John Major and caterer Claire Latimer (which was at the time subject to libel proceedings).

Brinkhurst moved to Edinburgh in the early 2000s. He managed the band Young Fathers, co-producing and co-writing five of their albums. 

In 2017, Brinkhurst teamed up again with the Cuff sisters, and main vocalist Law Holt, in the electronic music collective Iklan, who released their Album Number 1 on the Soulpunk label in 2020.

Discography

Albums
Noise (1989)
Goddess (1990) (AUS #102)
Thug (1992)
Baby Baby Baby Baby (1993)
Yard (1994)
Soho – Soho (1996)
Another London (1997)
Family BC (1999)

Singles

References

External links

English pop music groups
British musical trios
Musical groups established in 1989
Musical groups disestablished in 1999
Alternative dance musical groups
Trip hop groups
Atco Records artists